Ewa Kupiec (born 2 November 1964 in Duszniki-Zdrój) is a Polish classical pianist.

In 1992 she  won the ARD Music Competition in the piano/cello category. In 2005 she performed Schnittke’s First Piano Concerto with the Berlin Radio Symphony Orchestra at the Berlin Konzerthaus, the first performance of the concerto since 1964. Since 2011 she has been a professor at the Hochschule für Musik, Theater und Medien Hannover.

Kupiec has performed with the Munich Philharmonic, Leipzig Gewandhaus, Orchestre de Paris, Royal Danish Orchestra, Royal Philharmonic Orchestra, Warsaw Philharmonic, Royal Liverpool Philharmonic, City of Birmingham Symphony, Royal Stockholm Philharmonic, Sao Paulo Symphony Orchestra, Minnesota Orchestra and Melbourne Symphony Orchestra.

In July 2018 she was elected as a member of the European Academy of Sciences and Arts.

References

External links
 Ewa Kupiec: Discography from All Music
 
 

Polish classical pianists
Polish women pianists
German classical pianists
German women pianists
1964 births
Living people
Place of birth missing (living people)
21st-century classical pianists
Women classical pianists
21st-century women pianists